The 2005–06 Northern Counties East Football League season was the 24th in the history of Northern Counties East Football League, a football competition in England.

Premier Division

The Premier Division featured 18 clubs which competed in the previous season, along with two new clubs, promoted from Division One:
Garforth Town
Sutton Town

League table

Division One

Division One featured 14 clubs which competed in the previous season, along with two new clubs:
Borrowash Victoria, relegated from the Premier Division
Teversal, joined from the Central Midlands League

League table

References

External links
 Northern Counties East Football League

2005-06
9